David Crosson (born 24 November 1952) is an English former footballer who made 134 appearances in the Football League playing as a right back for Newcastle United and Darlington in the 1970s.

Crosson was born in Bishop Auckland, County Durham, and began his football career as a junior with Newcastle United. He made his first-team debut in the Texaco Cup in October 1973, and had a run of games in the First Division towards the end of the 1973–74 season. He was unable to dislodge long-time incumbent right-back David Craig, and in 1975 moved on to Fourth Division club Darlington on a free transfer. He played 128 league matches over the next five seasons, scoring twice, before moving into non-league football with Crook Town. Crosson then moved to Tasmania where he played for Rapid and the Tasmania representative side and later went into coaching.

References

1952 births
Living people
Sportspeople from Bishop Auckland
Footballers from County Durham
English footballers
Association football defenders
Newcastle United F.C. players
Darlington F.C. players
Crook Town A.F.C. players
English Football League players
Expatriate soccer players in Australia
English emigrants to Australia